The Rockwell B-1 Lancer is a supersonic variable-sweep wing, heavy bomber used by the United States Air Force. It is commonly called the "Bone" (from "B-One"). It is one of three strategic bombers serving in the U.S. Air Force fleet along with the B-2 Spirit and the B-52 Stratofortress .

The B-1 was first envisioned in the 1960s as a platform that would combine the Mach 2 speed of the B-58 Hustler with the range and payload of the B-52, and was meant to ultimately replace both bombers. After a long series of studies, Rockwell International (now part of Boeing) won the design contest for what emerged as the B-1A. This version had a top speed of Mach 2.2 at high altitude and the ability to fly for long distances at Mach 0.85 at very low altitudes. The combination of the high cost of the aircraft, the introduction of the AGM-86 cruise missile that flew the same basic speed and distance, and early work on the B-2 stealth bomber reduced the need for the B-1. The program was canceled in 1977, after the B-1A prototypes had been built.

The program was restarted in 1981, largely as an interim measure due to delays in the B-2 stealth bomber program. The B-1A design was altered,  reducing top speed to Mach 1.25 at high altitude, increasing low-altitude speed to Mach 0.96, extensively improving electronic components, and upgrading the airframe to carry more fuel and weapons. Dubbed the B-1B, deliveries of the new variant began in 1986; the plane formally entered service with Strategic Air Command (SAC) as a nuclear bomber that same year. By 1988, all 100 aircraft had been delivered.

With the disestablishment of SAC and its reassignment to the Air Combat Command in 1992, the B-1B was converted for a conventional bombing role. It first served in combat during Operation Desert Fox in 1998 and again during the NATO action in Kosovo the following year. The B-1B has supported U.S. and NATO military forces in Afghanistan and Iraq. As of 2021 the Air Force has 45 B-1Bs. 

The Northrop Grumman B-21 Raider is to begin replacing the B-1B after 2025; all B-1s are planned to be retired by 2036.

Development

Background

In 1955, the USAF issued requirements for a new bomber combining the payload and range of the Boeing B-52 Stratofortress with the Mach 2 maximum speed of the Convair B-58 Hustler. In December 1957, the USAF selected North American Aviation's B-70 Valkyrie for this role, a six-engine bomber that could cruise at Mach 3 at high altitude. Soviet Union interceptor aircraft, the only effective anti-bomber weapon in the 1950s, were already unable to intercept the high-flying Lockheed U-2; the Valkyrie would fly at similar altitudes, but much higher speeds, and was expected to fly right by the fighters.

By the late 1950s, however, anti-aircraft surface-to-air missiles (SAMs) could threaten high-altitude aircraft, as demonstrated by the 1960 downing of Gary Powers' U-2. The USAF Strategic Air Command (SAC) was aware of these developments and had begun moving its bombers to low-level penetration even before the U-2 incident. This tactic greatly reduces radar detection distances through the use of terrain masking; using features of the terrain like hills and valleys, the line-of-sight from the radar to the bomber can be broken, rendering the radar (and human observers) incapable of seeing it. Additionally, radars of the era were subject to "clutter" from stray returns from the ground and other objects, which meant a minimum angle existed above the horizon where they could detect a target. Bombers flying at low altitudes could remain under these angles simply by keeping their distance from the radar sites. This combination of effects made SAMs of the era ineffective against low-flying aircraft. The same effects also meant that low-flying aircraft were difficult to detect by higher-flying interceptors, since their radar systems could not readily pick out aircraft against the clutter from ground reflections (lack of look-down/shoot-down capability).

The switch from high-altitude to low-altitude flight profiles severely affected the B-70, the design of which was tuned for high-altitude performance. Higher aerodynamic drag at low level limited the B-70 to subsonic speed while dramatically decreasing its range. The result would be an aircraft with somewhat higher subsonic speed than the B-52, but less range. Because of this, and a growing shift to the intercontinental ballistic missile (ICBM) force, the B-70 bomber program was cancelled in 1961 by President John F. Kennedy, and the two XB-70 prototypes were used in a supersonic research program.

Although never intended for the low-level role, the B-52's flexibility allowed it to outlast its intended successor as the nature of the air war environment changed. The B-52's huge fuel load allowed it to operate at lower altitudes for longer times, and the large airframe allowed the addition of improved radar jamming and deception suites to deal with radars. The much smaller bomb bay of the B-70 would have made it much less useful in this role.

Design studies and delays
Although effective, the B-52 was not ideal for the low-level role. This led to a number of aircraft designs known as penetrators, which were tuned specifically for long-range low-altitude flight. The first of these designs to see operation was the supersonic F-111 fighter-bomber, which used variable-sweep wings for tactical missions. A number of studies on a strategic-range counterpart followed.

The first post-B-70 strategic penetrator study was known as the Subsonic Low-Altitude Bomber (SLAB), which was completed in 1961. This produced a design that looked more like an airliner than a bomber, with a large swept wing, T-tail, and large high-bypass engines. This was followed by the similar Extended Range Strike Aircraft (ERSA), which added a variable-sweep wing, then en vogue in the aviation industry. ERSA envisioned a relatively small aircraft with a  payload and a range of  including  flown at low altitudes.

These all culminated in the October 1963 Advanced Manned Precision Strike System (AMPSS), which led to industry studies at Boeing, General Dynamics, and North American. In mid-1964, the USAF had revised its requirements and retitled the project as Advanced Manned Strategic Aircraft (AMSA), which differed from AMPSS primarily in that it also demanded a high-speed high-altitude capability, similar to that of the existing Mach 2-class F-111. Given the lengthy series of design studies, Rockwell engineers joked that the new name actually stood for "America's Most Studied Aircraft".

The arguments that led to the cancellation of the B-70 program had led some to question the need for a new strategic bomber of any sort. The USAF was adamant about retaining bombers as part of the nuclear triad concept that included bombers, ICBMs, and submarine-launched ballistic missiles (SLBMs) in a combined package that complicated any potential defense. They argued that the bomber was needed to attack hardened military targets and to provide a safe counterforce option because the bombers could be quickly launched into safe loitering areas where they could not be attacked. However, the introduction of the SLBM made moot the mobility and survivability argument, and a newer generation of ICBMs, such as the Minuteman III, had the accuracy and speed needed to attack point targets. During this time, ICBMs were seen as a less costly option based on their lower unit cost, but development costs were much higher. Secretary of Defense Robert McNamara preferred ICBMs over bombers for the Air Force portion of the deterrent force and felt a new expensive bomber was not needed. McNamara limited the AMSA program to studies and component development beginning in 1964.

Program studies continued; IBM and Autonetics were awarded AMSA advanced avionics study contracts in 1968. McNamara remained opposed to the program in favor of upgrading the existing B-52 fleet and adding nearly 300 FB-111s for shorter range roles then being filled by the B-58. He again vetoed funding for AMSA aircraft development in 1968.

B-1A program

President Richard Nixon reestablished the AMSA program after taking office, keeping with his administration's flexible response strategy that required a broad range of options short of general nuclear war. Nixon's Secretary of Defense, Melvin Laird, reviewed the programs and decided to lower the numbers of FB-111s, since they lacked the desired range, and recommended that the AMSA design studies be accelerated. In April 1969, the program officially became the B-1A. This was the first entry in the new bomber designation series, created in 1962. The Air Force issued a request for proposals in November 1969.

Proposals were submitted by Boeing, General Dynamics and North American Rockwell in January 1970. In June 1970, North American Rockwell was awarded the development contract. The original program called for two test airframes, five flyable aircraft, and 40 engines. This was cut in 1971 to one ground and three flight test aircraft. The company changed its name to Rockwell International and named its aircraft division North American Aircraft Operations in 1973. A fourth prototype, built to production standards, was ordered in the fiscal year 1976 budget. Plans called for 240 B-1As to be built, with initial operational capability set for 1979.

Rockwell's design had features common to the General Dynamics F-111 Aardvark and North American XB-70 Valkyrie. It used a crew escape capsule, that ejected as a unit to improve crew survivability if the crew had to abandon the aircraft at high speed. Additionally, the design featured large variable-sweep wings in order to provide both more lift during takeoff and landing, and lower drag during a high-speed dash phase. With the wings set to their widest position the aircraft had a much better airfield performance than the B-52, allowing it to operate from a wider variety of bases. Penetration of the Soviet Union's defenses would take place at supersonic speed, crossing them as quickly as possible before entering the more sparsely defended interior of the country where speeds could be reduced again. The large size and fuel capacity of the design would allow the "dash" portion of the flight to be relatively long.

In order to achieve the required Mach 2 performance at high altitudes, the exhaust nozzles and air intake ramps were variable. Initially, it had been expected that a Mach 1.2 performance could be achieved at low altitude, which required that titanium be used in critical areas in the fuselage and wing structure. The low altitude performance requirement was later lowered to Mach 0.85, reducing the amount of titanium and therefore cost. A pair of small vanes mounted near the nose are part of an active vibration damping system that smooths out the otherwise bumpy low-altitude ride. The first three B-1As featured the escape capsule that ejected the cockpit with all four crew members inside. The fourth B-1A was equipped with a conventional ejection seat for each crew member.

The B-1A mockup review occurred in late October 1971; this resulted in 297 requests for alteration to the design due to failures to meet specifications and desired improvements for ease of maintenance and operation. The first B-1A prototype (Air Force serial no. 74–0158) flew on 23 December 1974.  As the program continued the per-unit cost continued to rise in part because of high inflation during that period. In 1970, the estimated unit cost was $40 million, and by 1975, this figure had climbed to $70 million.

New problems and cancellation

In 1976, Soviet pilot Viktor Belenko defected to Japan with his MiG-25 "Foxbat". During debriefing he described a new "super-Foxbat" (almost certainly referring to the MiG-31) that had look-down/shoot-down radar in order to attack cruise missiles. This would also make any low-level penetration aircraft "visible" and easy to attack. Given that the B-1's armament suite was similar to the B-52, and it now appeared no more likely to survive Soviet airspace than the B-52, the program was increasingly questioned. In particular, Senator William Proxmire continually derided the B-1 in public, arguing it was an outlandishly expensive dinosaur. During the 1976 federal election campaign, Jimmy Carter made it one of the Democratic Party's platforms, saying "The B-1 bomber is an example of a proposed system which should not be funded and would be wasteful of taxpayers' dollars."

When Carter took office in 1977 he ordered a review of the entire program. By this point the projected cost of the program had risen to over $100 million per aircraft, although this was lifetime cost over 20 years. He was informed of the relatively new work on stealth aircraft that had started in 1975, and he decided that this was a better approach than the B-1. Pentagon officials also stated that the AGM-86 Air-Launched Cruise Missile (ALCM) launched from the existing B-52 fleet would give the USAF equal capability of penetrating Soviet airspace. A small number of B-52s could launch hundreds of ALCMs, saturating the defense. A program to improve the B-52 and develop and deploy the ALCM would cost at least 20% less than the planned 244 B-1As.

On 30 June 1977, Carter announced that the B-1A would be canceled in favor of ICBMs, SLBMs, and a fleet of modernized B-52s armed with ALCMs. Carter called it "one of the most difficult decisions that I've made since I've been in office."  No mention of the stealth work was made public with the program being top secret, but it is now known that in early 1978 he authorized the Advanced Technology Bomber (ATB) project, which eventually led to the B-2 Spirit.

Domestically, the reaction to the cancellation was split along partisan lines. The Department of Defense was surprised by the announcement; it expected that the number of B-1s ordered would be reduced to around 150. Congressman Robert Dornan (R-CA) claimed, "They're breaking out the vodka and caviar in Moscow." However, it appears the Soviets were more concerned by large numbers of ALCMs representing a much greater threat than a smaller number of B-1s. Soviet news agency TASS commented that "the implementation of these militaristic plans has seriously complicated efforts for the limitation of the strategic arms race." Western military leaders were generally happy with the decision. NATO commander Alexander Haig described the ALCM as an "attractive alternative" to the B-1. French General Georges Buis stated "The B-1 is a formidable weapon, but not terribly useful. For the price of one bomber, you can have 200 cruise missiles."

Flight tests of the four B-1A prototypes for the B-1A program continued through April 1981. The program included 70 flights totaling 378 hours. A top speed of Mach 2.22 was reached by the second B-1A. Engine testing also continued during this time with the YF101 engines totaling almost 7,600 hours.

Shifting priorities

It was during this period that the Soviets started to assert themselves in several new theaters of action, in particular through Cuban proxies during the Angolan Civil War starting in 1975 and the Soviet invasion of Afghanistan in 1979. U.S. strategy to this point had been focused on containing Communism and preparation for war in Europe. The new Soviet actions revealed that the military lacked capability outside these narrow confines.

The U.S. Department of Defense responded by accelerating its Rapid Deployment Forces concept but suffered from major problems with airlift and sealift capability. In order to slow an enemy invasion of other countries, air power was critical; however the key Iran-Afghanistan border was outside the range of the U.S. Navy's carrier-based attack aircraft, leaving this role to the U.S. Air Force.

During the 1980 presidential campaign, Ronald Reagan campaigned heavily on the platform that Carter was weak on defense, citing the cancellation of the B-1 program as an example, a theme he continued using into the 1980s. During this time Carter's defense secretary, Harold Brown, announced the stealth bomber project, apparently implying that this was the reason for the B-1 cancellation.

B-1B program

On taking office, Reagan was faced with the same decision as Carter before: whether to continue with the B-1 for the short term, or to wait for the development of the ATB, a much more advanced aircraft. Studies suggested that the existing B-52 fleet with ALCM would remain a credible threat until 1985. It was predicted that 75% of the B-52 force would survive to attack its targets. After 1985, the introduction of the SA-10 missile, the MiG-31 interceptor and the first effective Soviet Airborne Early Warning and Control (AWACS) systems would make the B-52 increasingly vulnerable. During 1981, funds were allocated to a new study for a bomber for the 1990s time-frame which led to developing the Long-Range Combat Aircraft (LRCA) project. The LRCA evaluated the B-1, F-111, and ATB as possible solutions; an emphasis was placed on multi-role capabilities, as opposed to purely strategic operations.

In 1981, it was believed the B-1 could be in operation before the ATB, covering the transitional period between the B-52's increasing vulnerability and the ATB's introduction. Reagan decided the best solution was to procure both the B-1 and ATB, and on 2 October 1981 he announced that 100 B-1s were to be ordered to fill the LRCA role.

In January 1982, the U.S. Air Force awarded two contracts to Rockwell worth a combined $2.2 billion for the development and production of 100 new B-1 bombers. Numerous changes were made to the design to make it better suited to the now expected missions, resulting in the B-1B. These changes included a reduction in maximum speed, which allowed the variable-aspect intake ramps to be replaced by simpler fixed geometry intake ramps. This reduced the B-1B's radar cross-section which was seen as a good trade off for the speed decrease. High subsonic speeds at low altitude became a focus area for the revised design, and low-level speeds were increased from about Mach 0.85 to 0.92. The B-1B has a maximum speed of Mach 1.25 at higher altitudes.

The weight increase was to allow for takeoff with a full internal fuel load and for external weapons to be carried. Rockwell engineers were able to reinforce critical areas and lighten non-critical areas of the airframe, so the increase in empty weight was minimal. To deal with the introduction of the MiG-31 equipped with the new Zaslon radar system, and other aircraft with look-down capability, the B-1B's electronic warfare suite was significantly upgraded.

Opposition to the plan was widespread within Congress. Critics pointed out that many of the original problems remained in both areas of performance and expense. In particular it seemed the B-52 fitted with electronics similar to the B-1B would be equally able to avoid interception, as the speed advantage of the B-1 was now minimal. It also appeared that the "interim" time frame served by the B-1B would be less than a decade, being rendered obsolete shortly after the introduction of a much more capable ATB design. The primary argument in favor of the B-1 was its large conventional weapon payload, and that its takeoff performance allowed it to operate with a credible bomb load from a much wider variety of airfields. Production subcontracts were spread across many congressional districts, making the aircraft more popular on Capitol Hill.

B-1A No. 1 was disassembled and used for radar testing at the Rome Air Development Center at the former Griffiss Air Force Base, New York. B-1As No. 2 and No. 4 were then modified to include B-1B systems. The first B-1B was completed and began flight testing in March 1983. The first production B-1B was rolled out on 4 September 1984 and first flew on 18 October 1984. The 100th and final B-1B was delivered on 2 May 1988; before the last B-1B was delivered, the USAF had determined that the aircraft was vulnerable to Soviet air defenses.

Design

Overview
The B-1 has a blended wing body configuration, with variable-sweep wing, four turbofan engines, triangular ride-control fins and cruciform tail. The wings can sweep from 15 degrees to 67.5 degrees (full forward to full sweep). Forward-swept wing settings are used for takeoff, landings and high-altitude economical cruise. Aft-swept wing settings are used in high subsonic and supersonic flight. The B-1's variable-sweep wings and thrust-to-weight ratio provide it with improved takeoff performance, allowing it to use shorter runways than previous bombers. The length of the aircraft presented a flexing problem due to air turbulence at low altitude. To alleviate this, Rockwell included small triangular fin control surfaces or vanes near the nose on the B-1. The B-1's Structural Mode Control System moves the vanes, and lower rudder, to counteract the effects of turbulence and smooth out the ride.

Unlike the B-1A, the B-1B cannot reach Mach 2+ speeds; its maximum speed is Mach 1.25 (about 950 mph or 1,530 km/h at altitude), but its low-level speed increased to Mach 0.92 (700 mph, 1,130 km/h). The speed of the current version of the aircraft is limited by the need to avoid damage to its structure and air intakes. To help lower its radar cross-section, the B-1B uses serpentine air intake ducts (see S-duct) and fixed intake ramps, which limit its speed compared to the B-1A. Vanes in the intake ducts serve to deflect and shield radar returns from the highly reflective engine compressor blades.

The B-1A's engine was modified slightly to produce the GE F101-102 for the B-1B, with an emphasis on durability, and increased efficiency. The core from this engine was subsequently used in several other engines, including the GE F110 used in the F-14 Tomcat, F-15K/SG variants and later versions of the General Dynamics F-16 Fighting Falcon. It is also the basis for the non-afterburning GE F118 used in the B-2 Spirit and the U-2S. The F101 engine core is also used in the CFM56 civil engine.

The nose-gear door is the location for ground-crew control of the auxiliary power unit (APU) which can be used during a scramble for quick-starting the APU.

Avionics

The B-1's main computer is the IBM AP-101, which was also used on the Space Shuttle orbiter and the B-52 bomber. The computer is programmed with the JOVIAL programming language. The Lancer's offensive avionics include the Westinghouse (now Northrop Grumman) AN/APQ-164 forward-looking offensive passive electronically scanned array radar set with electronic beam steering (and a fixed antenna pointed downward for reduced radar observability), synthetic aperture radar, ground moving target indication (GMTI), and terrain-following radar modes, Doppler navigation, radar altimeter, and an inertial navigation suite. The B-1B Block D upgrade added a Global Positioning System (GPS) receiver beginning in 1995.

The B-1's defensive electronics include the Eaton AN/ALQ-161A radar warning and defensive jamming equipment, which has three sets of antennas; one at the front base of each wing and the third rear-facing in the tail radome. Also in the tail radome is the AN/ALQ-153 missile approach warning system (pulse-Doppler radar). The ALQ-161 is linked to a total of eight AN/ALE-49 flare dispensers located on top behind the canopy, which are handled by the AN/ASQ-184 avionics management system. Each AN/ALE-49 dispenser has a capacity of 12 MJU-23A/B flares. The B-1 has also been equipped to carry the ALE-50 towed decoy system.

Also aiding the B-1's survivability is its relatively low RCS. Although not technically a stealth aircraft, thanks to the aircraft's structure, serpentine intake paths and use of radar-absorbent material its RCS is about 1/50th that of the similar sized B-52. This is approximately 26 ft2 or 2.4 m2, comparable to that of a small fighter aircraft.

The B-1 holds 61 FAI world records for speed, payload, distance, and time-to-climb in different aircraft weight classes. In November 1993, three B-1Bs set a long-distance record for the aircraft, which demonstrated its ability to conduct extended mission lengths to strike anywhere in the world and return to base without any stops. The National Aeronautic Association recognized the B-1B for completing one of the 10 most memorable record flights for 1994.

Upgrades

The B-1 has been upgraded since production, beginning with the "Conventional Mission Upgrade Program" (CMUP), which added a new MIL-STD-1760 smart-weapons interface to enable the use of precision-guided conventional weapons. CMUP was delivered through a series of upgrades:
Block A was the standard B-1B with the capability to deliver non-precision gravity bombs.
Block B brought an improved Synthetic Aperture Radar, and upgrades to the Defensive Countermeasures System and was fielded in 1995.
Block C provided an "enhanced capability" for delivery of up to 30 cluster bomb units (CBUs) per sortie with modifications made to 50 bomb racks.
Block D added a "Near Precision Capability" via improved weapons and targeting systems, and added advanced secure communications capabilities. The first part of the electronic countermeasures upgrade added Joint Direct Attack Munition (JDAM), ALE-50 towed decoy system, and anti-jam radios. 
Block E upgraded the avionics computers and incorporated the Wind Corrected Munitions Dispenser (WCMD), the AGM-154 Joint Standoff Weapon (JSOW) and the AGM-158 JASSM (Joint Air to Surface Standoff Munition), substantially improving the bomber's capability. Upgrades were completed in September 2006. 
Block F was the Defensive Systems Upgrade Program (DSUP) to improve the aircraft's electronic countermeasures and jamming capabilities, but it was canceled in December 2002 due to cost overruns and delays.

In 2007, the Sniper XR targeting pod was integrated on the B-1 fleet. The pod is mounted on an external hardpoint at the aircraft's chin near the forward bomb bay. Following accelerated testing, the Sniper pod was fielded in summer 2008. Future precision munitions include the Small Diameter Bomb.

The USAF commenced the Integrated Battle Station (IBS) modification in 2012 as a combination of three separate upgrades when it realised the benefits of completing them concurrently; the Fully Integrated Data Link (FIDL), Vertical Situational Display Unit (ASDU) and Central Integrated Test System (CITS). FIDL enables electronic data sharing, eliminating the need to enter information between systems by hand. VSDU replaces existing flight instruments with multifunction color displays, a second display aids with threat evasion and targeting, and acts as a back-up display. CITS saw a new diagnostic system installed that allows crew to monitor over 9,000 parameters on the aircraft.  Other additions are to replace the two spinning mass gyroscopic inertial navigation system with ring laser gyroscopic systems and a GPS antenna, replacement of the APQ-164 radar with the Scalable Agile Beam Radar – Global Strike (SABR-GS) active electronically scanned array, and a new attitude indicator. The IBS upgrades were completed in 2020.

In August 2019, the Air Force unveiled a modification to the B-1B to allow it to carry more weapons internally and externally. Using the moveable forward bulkhead, space in the intermediate bay was increased from 180 to 269 in (457 to 683 cm). Expanding the internal bay to make use of the Common Strategic Rotary Launcher (CSRL), as well as utilizing six of the eight external hardpoints that had been previously out of use to keep in line with the New START Treaty, would increase the B-1B's weapon load from 24 to 40. The configuration also enables it to carry heavier weapons in the 5,000 lb (2,300 kg) range, such as hypersonic missiles; the AGM-183 ARRW is planned for integration onto the bomber. In the future the HAWC could be used by the bomber which, combining both internal and external weapon carriage, could conceivably bring the total number of hypersonic weapons to 31.

Operational history

Strategic Air Command
The second B-1B, "The Star of Abilene", was the first B-1B delivered to SAC in June 1985. Initial operational capability was reached on 1 October 1986 and the B-1B was placed on nuclear alert status. The B-1 received the official name "Lancer" on 15 March 1990. However, the bomber has been commonly called the "Bone"; a nickname that appears to stem from an early newspaper article on the aircraft wherein its name was phonetically spelled out as "B-ONE" with the hyphen inadvertently omitted.

In late 1990, engine fires in two Lancers led to a grounding of the fleet. The cause was traced back to problems in the first-stage fan, and the aircraft were placed on "limited alert"; in other words, they were grounded unless a nuclear war broke out. Following inspections and repairs they were returned to duty beginning on 6 February 1991. By 1991, the B-1 had a fledgling conventional capability, forty of them able to drop the  Mk-82 General Purpose (GP) bomb, although mostly from low altitude. Despite being cleared for this role, the problems with the engines prevented their use in Operation Desert Storm during the Gulf War. B-1s were primarily reserved for strategic nuclear strike missions at this time, providing the role of airborne nuclear deterrent against the Soviet Union. The B-52 was more suited to the role of conventional warfare and it was used by coalition forces instead.

Originally designed strictly for nuclear war, the B-1's development as an effective conventional bomber was delayed. The collapse of the Soviet Union had brought the B-1's nuclear role into question, leading to President George H. W. Bush ordering a $3 billion conventional refit.

After the inactivation of SAC and the establishment of the Air Combat Command (ACC) in 1992, the B-1 developed a greater conventional weapons capability. Part of this development was the start-up of the U.S. Air Force Weapons School B-1 Division. In 1994, two additional B-1 bomb wings were also created in the Air National Guard, with former fighter wings in the Kansas Air National Guard and the Georgia Air National Guard converting to the aircraft. By the mid-1990s, the B-1 could employ GP weapons as well as various CBUs. By the end of the 1990s, with the advent of the "Block D" upgrade, the B-1 boasted a full array of guided and unguided munitions.

The B-1B no longer carries nuclear weapons; its nuclear capability was disabled by 1995 with the removal of nuclear arming and fuzing hardware. Under provisions of the New START treaty with Russia, further conversions were performed. These included modification of aircraft hardpoints to prevent nuclear weapon pylons from being attached, removal of weapons bay wiring bundles for arming nuclear weapons, and destruction of nuclear weapon pylons. The conversion process was completed in 2011, and Russian officials inspect the aircraft every year to verify compliance.

Air Combat Command

The B-1 was first used in combat in support of operations in Iraq during Operation Desert Fox in December 1998, employing unguided GP weapons. B-1s have been subsequently used in Operation Allied Force (Kosovo) and, most notably, in Operation Enduring Freedom in Afghanistan and the 2003 invasion of Iraq. The B-1 has deployed an array of conventional weapons in war zones, most notably the GBU-31,  JDAM. In the first six months of Operation Enduring Freedom, eight B-1s dropped almost 40 percent of aerial ordnance, including some 3,900 JDAMs. JDAM munitions were heavily used by the B-1 over Iraq, notably on 7 April 2003 in an unsuccessful attempt to kill Saddam Hussein and his two sons. During Operation Enduring Freedom, the B-1 was able to raise its mission capable rate to 79%.

Of the 100 B-1Bs built, 93 remained in 2000 after losses in accidents. In June 2001, the Pentagon sought to place one-third of its then fleet into storage; this proposal resulted in several U.S. Air National Guard officers and members of Congress lobbying against the proposal, including the drafting of an amendment to prevent such cuts. The 2001 proposal was intended to allow money to be diverted to further upgrades to the remaining B-1Bs, such as computer modernization. In 2003, accompanied by the removal of B-1Bs from the two bomb wings in the Air National Guard, the USAF decided to retire 33 aircraft to concentrate its budget on maintaining availability of remaining B-1Bs. In 2004, a new appropriation bill called for some retired aircraft to return to service, and the USAF returned seven mothballed bombers to service to increase the fleet to 67 aircraft.

On 14 July 2007, the Associated Press reported on the growing USAF presence in Iraq, including reintroduction of B-1Bs as a close-at-hand platform to support Coalition ground forces. Beginning in 2008, B-1s were used in Iraq and Afghanistan in an "armed overwatch" role, loitering for surveillance purposes while ready to deliver guided bombs in support of ground troops as required.

The B-1B underwent a series of flight tests using a 50/50 mix of synthetic and petroleum fuel; on 19 March 2008, a B-1B from Dyess Air Force Base, Texas, became the first USAF aircraft to fly at supersonic speed using a synthetic fuel during a flight over Texas and New Mexico. This was conducted as part of an USAF testing and certification program to reduce reliance on traditional oil sources. On 4 August 2008, a B-1B flew the first Sniper Advanced Targeting Pod equipped combat sortie where the crew successfully targeted enemy ground forces and dropped a GBU-38 guided bomb in Afghanistan.

In March 2011, B-1Bs from Ellsworth Air Force Base attacked undisclosed targets in Libya as part of Operation Odyssey Dawn.

With upgrades to keep the B-1 viable, the USAF may keep it in service until approximately 2038. Despite upgrades, a single flight hour needs 48.4 hours of repair. The fuel, repairs, and other needs for a 12-hour mission cost $720,000 as of 2010. The $63,000 cost per flight hour is, however, less than the $72,000 for the B-52 and the $135,000 of the B-2. In June 2010, senior USAF officials met to consider retiring the entire fleet to meet budget cuts. The Pentagon plans to begin replacing the aircraft with the B-21 Raider after 2025. In the meantime, its "capabilities are particularly well-suited to the vast distances and unique challenges of the Pacific region, and we'll continue to invest in, and rely on, the B-1 in support of the focus on the Pacific" as part of President Obama's "Pivot to East Asia".

In August 2012, the 9th Expeditionary Bomb Squadron returned from a six-month tour in Afghanistan. Its 9 B-1Bs flew 770 sorties, the most of any B-1B squadron on a single deployment. The squadron spent 9,500 hours airborne, keeping one of its bombers in the air at all times. They accounted for a quarter of all combat aircraft sorties over the country during that time and fulfilled an average of two to three air support requests per day. On 4 September 2013, a B-1B participated in a maritime evaluation exercise, deploying munitions such as laser-guided 500 lb GBU-54 bombs, 500 lb and 2,000 lb JDAM, and Long Range Anti-Ship Missiles (LRASM). The aim was to detect and engage several small craft using existing weapons and tactics developed from conventional warfare against ground targets; the B-1 is seen as a useful asset for maritime duties such as patrolling shipping lanes.

Beginning in 2014, the B-1 was used against the Islamic State (IS) in the Syrian Civil War. From August 2014 to January 2015, the B-1 accounted for eight percent of USAF sorties during Operation Inherent Resolve. The 9th Bomb Squadron was deployed to Qatar in July 2014 to support missions in Afghanistan, but when the air campaign against IS began on 8 August, the aircraft were employed in Iraq.  During the Battle of Kobane in Syria, the squadron's B-1s dropped 660 bombs over 5 months in support of Kurdish forces defending the city. This amounted to one-third of all bombs used during OIR during the period, and they killed some 1,000 ISIL fighters. The 9th Bomb Squadron's B-1s went "Winchester"–dropping all weapons on board–31 times during their deployment. They dropped over 2,000 JDAMs during the six-month rotation. B-1s from the 28th Bomb Wing flew 490 sorties where they dropped 3,800 munitions on 3,700 targets during a six-month deployment. In February 2016, the B-1s were sent back to the U.S. for cockpit upgrades.

Air Force Global Strike Command
As part of a USAF reorganization announced in April 2015, all B-1s were reassigned from Air Combat Command to Global Strike Command (GSC) in October 2015.

On 8 July 2017, the USAF flew two B-1s near the North Korean border in a show of force amid increasing tensions, particularly in response to North Korea's 4 July test of an ICBM capable of reaching Alaska.

On 14 April 2018, B-1s launched 19 JASSM missiles as part of the 2018 bombing of Damascus and Homs in Syria. In August 2019, six B-1Bs met full mission capablity; 15 were undergoing depot maintenance and 39 under repair and inspection.

In February 2021, the USAF announced it will retire 17 B-1s, leaving 45 aircraft in service. Four of these will be stored in a condition that will allow their return to service if required.
 
In March 2021, B-1s deployed to Norway's Ørland Main Air Station for the first time. During the deployment, they conducted bombing training with Norwegian and Swedish ground force Joint terminal attack controllers. One B-1 also conducted a warm-pit refuel at Bodø Main Air Station, marking the first landing inside Norway's Arctic Circle, and integrated with four Swedish Air Force JAS 39 Gripen fighters.

Variants

B-1A The B-1A was the original B-1 design with variable engine intakes and Mach 2.2 top speed. Four prototypes were built; no production units were manufactured.
B-1B The B-1B is a revised B-1 design with reduced radar signature and a top speed of Mach 1.25. It is optimized for low-level penetration. A total of 100 B-1Bs were produced.
B-1R The B-1R was a 2004 proposed upgrade of existing B-1B aircraft. The B-1R (R for "regional") would be fitted with advanced radars, air-to-air missiles, and new Pratt & Whitney F119 engines (from the Lockheed Martin F-22 Raptor). This variant would have a top speed of Mach 2.2, but with 20% shorter range. Existing external hardpoints would be modified to allow multiple conventional weapons to be carried, increasing overall loadout. For air-to-air defense, an active electronically scanned array (AESA) radar would be added and some existing hardpoints modified to carry air-to-air missiles.

Operators

The USAF had 62 B-1Bs in service as of August 2017.

Aircraft on display

B-1A 
B-1B

Accidents and incidents

From 1984 to 2001, ten B-1s were lost due to accidents with 17 crew members or people on board killed.

 In September 1987, B-1B (serial number 84–0052) from the 96th Bomb Wing, 338th Combat Crew Training Squadron, Dyess AFB, crashed near La Junta, Colorado, while flying on a low-level training route. This was the only B-1B crash to occur with six crew members aboard. The two crew members in jump seats, and one of the four crew members in ejection seats perished. The root cause of the accident was thought to be a bird strike on a wing's leading edge during the low-level flight. The impact was severe enough to sever fuel and hydraulic lines on one side of the aircraft, while the other side's engines functioned long enough to allow for ejection. The B-1B fleet was later modified to protect these supply lines.
 In October 1990, while flying a training route in eastern Colorado, B-1B (86-0128) from the 384th Bomb Wing, 28th Bomb Squadron, McConnell AFB, experienced an explosion as the engines reached full power without afterburners. Fire on the aircraft's left was spotted. The No. 1 engine was shut down and its fire extinguisher was activated. The accident investigation determined that the engine had suffered catastrophic failure, engine blades had cut through the engine mounts and the engine became detached from the aircraft.
 In December 1990, B-1B (83-0071) from the 96th Bomb Wing, 337th Bomb Squadron, Dyess AFB, Texas, experienced a jolt that caused the No. 3 engine to shut down with its fire extinguisher activating. This event, coupled with the October 1990 engine incident, led to a 50+ day grounding of the B-1Bs not on nuclear alert status. The problem was eventually traced back to problems in the first-stage fan, and all B-1Bs were equipped with modified engines.

Specifications (B-1B)

Weapons loads

Notable appearances in media

See also

Notes

References

Bibliography

 
 Dao, James. "Much-Maligned B-1 Bomber Proves Hard to Kill." The New York Times, 1 August 2001.
 Donald, David, ed. "Rockwell B-1B". The Complete Encyclopedia of World Aircraft. New York: Barnes & Noble, 1997. .
 .
 
 .
 .
 
 
 

 
 
 
 
 
 .

External links

 B-1B Fact Sheet on af.mil
 B-1B product page and B-1B history page on Boeing.com
 B-1 history page on NASA/Langley Research Center site
 B-1B Lancer in Airman Magazine's Airframe Profiles
 

Aircraft first flown in 1974
Cruciform tail aircraft
Quadjets
B-001
1970s United States bomber aircraft
Variable-sweep-wing aircraft
Supersonic aircraft
Strategic bombers